The following is a list of the 104 municipalities (comuni) of the Province of Caserta, Campania, Italy.

List

See also
List of municipalities of Italy

References

Caserta